Un Viaje is the first live album by the rock band Café Tacvba. It was released in 2005 on Universal Music. The record is the band's seventh overall album, and consists of the songs played at the El Palacio de los Deportes concert. It was bundled with a DVD of the same concert, and included all of the songs present in the CDs.

Track listings

Disc 1

Disc 2

Disc 3

Band members
 Sizu Yantra (Rubén Albarrán): vocals, guitar
 Emmanuel Del Real: vocals, guitar, jarana, keyboard
 Joselo Rangel: vocals, guitar
 Quique Rangel: vocals, bass guitar

Sales and certifications

References

Café Tacuba live albums
2005 live albums
Latin Grammy Award for Best Long Form Music Video
Spanish-language live albums
Albums recorded at the Palacio de los Deportes